The Men's sprint event of the 2016 UCI Track Cycling World Championships was held on 4 and 5 March 2016. Jason Kenny of Great Britain won the gold medal, beating Matthew Glaetzer of Australia in the final.

Results

Qualifying
The qualifying was started at 09:00.

1/16 finals
The 1/16 finals were held at 10:09.

1/8 finals
The 1/8 finals were held at 11:41.

1/8 finals repechage
1/8 finals repechage was held at 12:08.

Quarterfinals
The Quarterfinals were started at 14:45.

Race for 5th–8th places
The race for 5th–8th places was held at 17:00.

Semifinals
The semifinals were started at 19:00.

Finals
The finals were started at 21:03.

References

Men's sprint
UCI Track Cycling World Championships – Men's sprint